The Sea Opera Towers is a complex of two luxury beachfront residential skyscrapers in the Israeli city of Netanya. Sea Opera 1 was completed in 2005, and is 87 metres high, with 28 floors. It was the tallest tower in the city until the completion of Sea Opera 2 in 2009. However, taller residential towers have since been built in Netanya and elsewhere.

The towers are clad in light- and dark-grey granite stone and comprise the tallest residential-only complex north of the Tel Aviv metropole. It includes a  park, outdoor swimming pool, jacuzzi, private sauna and gym.

See also
 List of skyscrapers in Israel

References
 Sea Opera 1 
 Sea Opera 2 at Emporis

External links
 Project website
 Danya Cebus page
 The Tavivian Group website

Residential buildings completed in 2005
Buildings and structures in Central District (Israel)
Netanya
Residential buildings completed in 2009
Twin towers
Residential skyscrapers in Israel